NGC 1992 (also known as PGC 17466) is a lenticular galaxy located in the Columba constellation. It was discovered by John Herschel on November 19, 1835. It is about 473 million light years from the Milky Way, Its apparent magnitude is 14.65 and its size is 1.10 x 0.7 arc minutes.

References

Lenticular galaxies
J05343177-3053492
423-G023
1992
017466
Columba (constellation)
Astronomical objects discovered in 1835
Discoveries by John Herschel